Eveready Battery Company, Inc.  is an American manufacturer of electric battery brands Eveready and Energizer, owned by Energizer Holdings. Its headquarters are located in St. Louis, Missouri.

The predecessor company began in 1890 in New York and was renamed in 1905. Today, the company makes batteries in the United States and China and has production facilities around the world.

History

On January 10, 1899, American Electrical Novelty and Manufacturing Company obtained U.S. Patent No. 617,592 (filed 12 March 1898) from David Misell, an inventor.  This "electric device" designed by Misell was powered by "D" batteries laid front-to-back in a paper tube with the light bulb and a rough brass reflector at the end.  Misell, the inventor of the tubular hand-held "electric device" (flashlight), assigned his invention over to the American Electrical Novelty and Manufacturing Company owned by Conrad Hubert.

In 1905, Hubert changed the name again to The American Ever Ready Company, selling flashlights and batteries under the trademark Ever Ready. In 1906 the British Ever Ready Electrical Company was formed for export of batteries; it became independent in 1914. In 1907 Ever Ready announced AA dry cell, and in 1911 it developed AAA dry cell.

In 1914, The American Ever Ready Company became part of National Carbon Company. Hubert stayed on as the president. The trademark was shortened to Eveready. In 1917, National Carbon Company merged with Union Carbide to form the Union Carbide and Carbon Company. From 1917 until 1921, Eveready used the trademark "DAYLO" for their flashlights and on their batteries.

In 1957, employees Lewis Urry, Paul Marsal and Karl Kordesch invented a long-lasting alkaline battery using a zinc/manganese dioxide chemistry while working for Union Carbide's Cleveland plant. The company did not aggressively market the invention, however, and instead continued to market the zinc–carbon battery. As a result, the company lost significant market share to Duracell.

Prior to March 1, 1980, the company's alkaline battery had been called the Eveready Alkaline Battery (1959–1968), Eveready Alkaline Energizer (1968–1974) and Eveready Alkaline Power Cell (1974–February 29, 1980). On March 1, 1980, it was rebadged under its current name, Energizer.

In 1986, Union Carbide sold its Battery Products Division to Ralston Purina Company for $1.4 billion. After the transfer, the division was named Eveready Battery Company, Inc., becoming a wholly owned subsidiary of Ralston Purina. At that time, the Eveready and Energizer batteries held 52 percent market share. The company under Ralston lost market share to rival Duracell.

In 1992, it bought the British Ever Ready Electrical Company (manufacturer of Gold Seal and Silver Seal batteries) from Hanson Trust, bringing its former subsidiary back under common ownership.

In 1999, Eveready sold its rechargeable battery division, although it still markets them for retail sale.

In 2000, Ralston spun off Eveready, and it was listed on the New York Stock Exchange as a holding company, Energizer Holdings, Inc., with Eveready Battery Company, Inc continuing as its most important daughter company.

The company's current US production facilities for batteries and battery parts are located in Asheboro, North Carolina; Bennington, Vermont; Maryville, Missouri; and Marietta, Ohio; with a technology center for research located in Westlake, Ohio. The majority of batteries are made in China. There are also numerous production facilities outside the US.

In October 2019, Eveready announced the planned closure of its Bennington, Vermont, plant. Production operations will be moved to a new facility in Portage, Wisconsin.

Advertising

In the 1920s, the company sponsored The Eveready Hour on radio.

In 1941 after the United States entered World War II, the slogan changed to "Change your batteries, get a nickel!" to encourage economic growth.

In the 1970s, actor Robert Conrad was the spokesman for Eveready Alkaline Power Cells, in which he compared his tough physique to the performance of the battery placed on his shoulder, and daring someone to knock it off.

In the early 1980s, it utilized the slogan, "Energized, for life!", showing people using Energizers in everyday situations.

In 1986, the company highlighted an advertising campaign best known for Mary Lou Retton averring:  "It's supercharged!"

In the late 1980s, there was an advertising campaign featuring Mark 'Jacko' Jackson and his pitch line "Energizer! It'll surprise you! Oi!".

Since 1988, the well-known Energizer Bunny has been featured in its television ads. The bunny was based on the similar Duracell Bunny, which was used in North America but is now used in the UK. Often, the bunny would appear in competition with inferior rival battery Supervolt, which was based on Duracell.

In Asia, Australia, NZ, and the UK, the mascot for Energizer is a muscle-bound anthropomorphic AA battery. He performs his actions with extreme speed, which is intended to illustrate that Energizer batteries are long lasting. This is primarily because Duracell advertises their batteries in the market using the Duracell Bunny.

Both the Eveready and Energizer marques are used under license by auto parts magnate Pep Boys for their in-house car batteries.  The Energizer logo used by Pep Boys is similar to the 1980s-era logo first used with the consumer dry cell batteries.

Both Eveready and Energizer are marketed as different brands in some markets in Asia. This has led to the availability of both "Eveready Gold" Alkaline batteries and Energizer Alkaline batteries on store shelves. However, both target different market segments and Eveready batteries tend to be marketed for lower end devices, while Energizer batteries are marketed for power-hungry devices and are priced accordingly.

Gallery

See also
 Eveready East Africa
 Eveready Industries India
 Battery holder
 Battery (vacuum tube)

References

External links

 Energizer Europe

Dow Chemical Company
Ralston Purina
Consumer battery manufacturers
American companies established in 1896
Electronics companies established in 1896
1986 mergers and acquisitions
American brands
Manufacturing companies based in St. Louis
1896 establishments in Missouri
Energizer Holdings

de:Energizer Holdings
fr:Energizer
id:Energizer Holdings
ja:エナジャイザー
zh:劲量